Maryland House of Delegates District 35A is one of the 67 districts that compose the Maryland House of Delegates. Along with subdistrict 35B, it makes up the 35th district of the Maryland Senate. District 35A includes part of Cecil County, and is represented by one delegate.

Demographic characteristics
As of the 2020 United States census, the district had a population of 45,011, of whom 35,002 (77.8%) were of voting age. The racial makeup of the district was 36,581 (81.3%) White, 3,453 (7.7%) African American, 143 (0.3%) Native American, 528 (1.2%) Asian, 21 (0.0%) Pacific Islander, 875 (1.9%) from some other race, and 3,420 (7.6%) from two or more races. Hispanic or Latino of any race were 2,345 (5.2%) of the population.

The district had 29,615 registered voters as of October 17, 2020, of whom 6,516 (22.0%) were registered as unaffiliated, 12,967 (43.8%) were registered as Republicans, 9,608 (32.4%) were registered as Democrats, and 305 (1.0%) were registered to other parties.

Past Election Results

1986

1990

1994

1998

2002

2006

2010

2014

2018

References

35A